Expo '85, officially called the , was a world's fair held in Tsukuba, Ibaraki, Japan (Tsukuba Science City, a planned city focused on technology north of Tokyo) between Sunday, March 17 and Monday, September 16, 1985.  The theme of the fair was "Dwellings and surroundings – Science and Technology for Man at Home". Attendance was over 20 million and 48 countries participated, along with several companies.

The exposition

The exhibition recognised by the Bureau International des Expositions (BIE), was devoted to the advancements in science and technology, and sought to highlight the impact of technological evolution on ordinary life to ensure that science and technology would be accessible to everyone.

The exhibition had a double intention. It was expected that the exposition would showcase Japan as a country of technological innovation. In addition, organisers hoped that the Expo would give some much needed exposure to Tsukuba, a city created 2 decades before as a scientific center, without much success.

Among the attractions of the exposition was the Jumbotron, a huge TV screen developed by the Japanese firm Sony.

Grouped by continent, the participant countries were as follows:
 Africa 

 
 

 Asia 

 
 
 
 

 
  
 
 
 

 The Americas 

 
 
 
 
 
 
 

 Europe 

 
 
 
 
 
 

 
 
 
 

 Oceania 

 
 
 

 
 
 

 

In regards to the companies, the ones who were present are as follows:

Daiei
Fujitsu 
Fuyo Group 
Hitachi 
IBM 
Japan Automobile Manufacturers Association 
Kodansha 
Matsushita 
Mitsubishi
Mitsui 
NEC 
NTT 
Shueisha
Sony 
Sumitomo Group
Suntory
TDK
Toshiba 
UCC Ueshima Coffee Co. 

Also  present were the United Nations, the European Economic Community, the Organisation for Economic Co-operation and Development (OECD) and the Asian Development Bank, along with the government of the Ibaraki prefecture.

Mascot
The mascot was Cosmo Hoshimaru was designed by a student in a design competition, and shows either a anthropomorphic planet with a ring or an alien astronaut with a flying saucer.

See also
 Technocosmos (Ferris wheel that was built for the Expo '85)

References

Further reading
Narita, Tatsushi. 'Tsukuba 1985.' In Encyclopedia of World's Fairs and Expositions, ed. John E. Findling and Kimberly D. Pelle. Jefferson, NC and London:McFarland, 2008. pp. 364–367.

External links 

Official website of the BIE
 European Patent Office
 ICAM Cell Universe exhibit at Expo '85
 ExpoMuseum page on Expo '85 
 Aerial photograph at the area, 1984
 Live performance at Expo '85 by Boz Scaggs
The International Exposition, Tsukuba, Japan, written in Japanese but equipped with a lot of pictures of representative pavilions.

World's fairs in Japan
Tsukuba, Ibaraki
1985 in Japan